Alberto Busnari (born 4 October 1978) is an Italian male artistic gymnast and part of the national team. He participated at the 2008 Summer Olympics in Beijing, China, the 2012 Summer Olympics in London, UK and 2013 World Artistic Gymnastics Championships in Antwerp, Belgium. An element on pommel horse is named after Busnari.

References

External links
 

1978 births
Living people
People from Melzo
Italian male artistic gymnasts
Gymnasts at the 2012 Summer Olympics
Olympic gymnasts of Italy
Gymnasts at the 2008 Summer Olympics
Gymnasts at the 2004 Summer Olympics
Gymnasts at the 2000 Summer Olympics
Universiade medalists in gymnastics
Mediterranean Games silver medalists for Italy
Mediterranean Games bronze medalists for Italy
Mediterranean Games medalists in gymnastics
Competitors at the 2001 Mediterranean Games
Competitors at the 2005 Mediterranean Games
Competitors at the 2009 Mediterranean Games
Universiade bronze medalists for Italy
Gymnasts of Centro Sportivo Aeronautica Militare
Medalists at the 1997 Summer Universiade
Sportspeople from the Metropolitan City of Milan
20th-century Italian people
21st-century Italian people